The men's 1500 metres at the 2004 Summer Olympics as part of the athletics program were held at the Athens Olympic Stadium from August 20 to 24. Thirty-eight athletes from 26 nations competed. The event was won by Hicham El Guerrouj of Morocco, the nation's first title in the event after coming second twice (1992 and 2000); El Guerrouj was the fifth man to win a second medal in the event. Bernard Lagat's silver put Kenya on the podium in the event for the third straight year; the United States (six times from 1896 to 1920) and Great Britain (four times from 1908 to 1924 and three times from 1980 to 1988) were the only other nations to have accomplished that. It also made Lagat the sixth man to win two medals in the event, just behind El Guerrouj in both 2000 and 2004. Rui Silva's bronze was Portugal's first medal in the event.

Summary

World record holder Hicham El Guerrouj came into the race with a target on his back.  Though El Guerrouj had won four straight World Championships, he had failed to win the previous Olympics, falling with a lap to go in his breakthrough year of 1996 and being beaten to the line in 2000 by the same Noah Ngeny who had chased El Guerrouj to the mile world record a year earlier.  Ngeny was not back but bronze medalist Bernard Lagat was, seeking to finally beat El Guerrouj.  Lagat had the potential assistance of two Kenyan teammates, but El Guerrouj also had his teammate Adil Kaouch make the final and Kaouch had previously sacrificed himself by acting as a pacesetter leading El Guerrouj to the 1999 and 2001 world titles.  Because of the assistance, El Guerrouj's ability in a strategic race was suspect.

Off the line, the three Kenyan runners took the lead and formed a wall keeping the field behind as they slowed the pace; El Guerrouj could not run away from the start and the race would be strategic.  With 500 metres to go, El Guerrouj worked his way to the front, with a line of kickers including Lagat, Reyes Estevez, Ivan Heshko and the unknown Mulugeta Wendimu lined up behind him.  Down the backstretch, Lagat stayed a step behind El Guerrouj as other speedsters jockeyed for position and then fell back.  From deep in the pack (dead last with less than 500 metres to go), Rui Silva was on the outside passing the others.  Around the final turn, Lagat edged his way closer to El Guerrouj, pulling even just at the head of the stretch, with Silva gaining to just a step behind.  By halfway down the home stretch, Lagat edged into the lead, but El Guerrouj did not go away, fighting back to take the win as Lagat gave up the fight a couple of steps before the line. After clearly running the fastest last lap, Silva was unable to make any further headway, celebrating his bronze medal as he finished.

Four days later, El Guerrouj outsprinted 10000 metres gold medalist Kenenisa Bekele to take the 5000 metres gold medal and never competed internationally again, officially retiring in 2006.

Background

This was the 25th appearance of the event, which is one of 12 athletics events to have been held at every Summer Olympics. Half of the finalists from 2000, including four of the top five but not the defending champion, returned: silver medalist Hicham El Guerrouj of Morocco, bronze medalist Bernard Lagat of Kenya, fourth-place finisher Mehdi Baala of France, fifth-place finisher Kevin Sullivan of Canada, eighth-place finisher Juan Carlos Higuero of Spain, and twelfth-place finisher Youssef Baba of Morocco. El Guerrouj (who had stretched his world championship streak to four and still held the world record) and Lagat were the strongest contenders; Lagat and Baala had finished second to El Guerrouj at the last two world championships.

Bahrain, Brunei, the Czech Republic, and Guam each made their first appearance in the event. The United States made its 24th appearance, most of all nations (having missed only the boycotted 1980 Games).

Qualification

The qualification period for athletics was 1 January 2003 to 9 August 2004. For the men's 1500 metres, each National Olympic Committee was permitted to enter up to three athletes that had run the race in 3:36.20 or faster during the qualification period. The maximum number of athletes per nation had been set at 3 since the 1930 Olympic Congress. If an NOC had no athletes that qualified under that standard, one athlete that had run the race in 3:38.00 or faster could be entered.

Competition format

The competition was again three rounds (used previously in 1952 and since 1964). The "fastest loser" system introduced in 1964 was used for both the first round and semifinals. The 12-man semifinals and finals introduced in 1984 and used since 1992 were retained.

As in 2000, there were three heats in the first round, each with 13 or 14 runners (before withdrawals). There was a slight move towards "fastest losers" advancing, with only the top five runners in each heat, along with the next nine fastest overall, advancing to the semifinals. The 24 semifinalists were divided into two semifinals, each with 12 runners. The top five men in each semifinal, plus the next two fastest overall, advanced to the 12-man final.

Records
, the existing World and Olympic records were as follows.

No new world or Olympic records were set during the competition. The following national records were established during the competition:

Schedule

All times are Eastern European Summer Time (UTC+3)

Results

Round 1
Qualification rule: The first five finishers in each heat (Q) plus the next nine fastest overall runners (q) advanced to the semifinals.

Heat 1

Heat 2

Heat 3

Semifinals
Qualification rule: The top five finishers in each heat (Q) plus the next two fastest overall runners (q) advanced to the final.

Semifinal 1

Semifinal 2

Final

References

External links
 IAAF Athens 2004 Olympic Coverage

M
1500 metres at the Olympics
Men's events at the 2004 Summer Olympics